Nils Trædal (29 November 1879 – 12 October 1948) was a Norwegian cleric and politician for the agrarian party Bondepartiet (later renamed Centre Party) and leader of the party from 1938 to 1948. He was Minister of Education and Church Affairs 1931-1932 and 1932–1933, as well as acting Prime Minister and acting Minister of Foreign Affairs in 1932.

Together with farmer and author Hans Seland and farmer union leader Hans Haga he was among the main agrarian party leaders to prevent the party from joining the fascist movement Nasjonal Samling, led by Vidkun Quisling.

He died after a fall from the second story of his home.

References

1879 births
1948 deaths
Government ministers of Norway
Members of the Storting
Centre Party (Norway) politicians
Norwegian people of World War II
Place of birth missing 
Place of death missing 
20th-century Norwegian politicians
People from Sunndal
Ministers of Education of Norway